Double Faced Ruby Lin is an album by Ruby Lin. It marks the release of the first album by Bertelsmann Music Group. After released an EP in 1999, Lin signed a contract with BMG and subsequently released her first full-length album.

Track listing
投懷送抱 Falling Into Your Arms
云深深雨蒙蒙 Dense Cloud Misty Rain
夜宿蘭桂坊 Overnight in Lan Kuai Fong
誰都不愛 To Love Nobody
不設防 Can't Let Go
冬眠地圖 Hibernating Map
新浪漫 New Romance
愛情小說 Novel of Love
每一種男生 Every Type of Guy
你這樣愛我 The Way You Love Me

Music video
投懷送抱 Falling Into Your Arms
雲深深雨蒙蒙 Dense Cloud Misty Rain
夜宿蘭桂坊 Overnight in Lan Kuai Fong
不設防 Can't Let Go
冬眠地圖 Hibernating Map
新浪漫 New Romance

Awards and nominations
HongKong MTV Music Award
 Won: Best music video of the year

Hong Kong Metro Radio Awards
 Won: Favorite new singer
 Nom : Golden song of the year

External links
Sina.com Music Page
[ Baidu Page]

2001 albums
Ruby Lin albums